Caladenia longicauda subsp. australora, commonly known as the southern white spider orchid, is a plant in the orchid family Orchidaceae and is endemic to the south-west of Western Australia. It has a single hairy leaf and up to three mostly white, relatively small flowers. It grows in woodland and mallee on the south coast in and near the Fitzgerald River National Park.

Description
The lateral sepals and petals have long drooping tips. Flowering occurs from September to October.

Taxonomy and naming
Caladenia longicauda was first formally described by John Lindley in 1840 and the description was published in A Sketch of the Vegetation of the Swan River Colony. In 2001 Stephen Hopper and Andrew Brown described eleven subspecies, including subspecies australora and the descriptions were published in Nuytsia. The subspecies name (australora) is a derived from the Latin words australis meaning “southern" and ora meaning "the coast" referring to the distribution of this subspecies.

Distribution and habitat
The southern white spider orchid occurs in the area between the Fitzgerald National Park and the Beaufort Inlet in the Esperance Plains biogeographic region where it grows in woodland in calcareous sand.

Conservation
Caladenia longicauda subsp. australora  is classified as "not threatened" by the Western Australian Government Department of Parks and Wildlife.

References

longicauda subsp. australora
Endemic orchids of Australia
Orchids of Western Australia
Plants described in 2001
Taxa named by Stephen Hopper
Taxa named by Andrew Phillip Brown